Smiling Billy is a 1927 American silent action film directed by Duke Worne and starring Billy Sullivan, Armida and Jimmy Aubrey.

Three American sailors on shore leave from the Pacific Fleet discover that a crazed inventor plans to launch an attack on the fleet and set out to thwart his plans.

Selected cast
 Billy Sullivan as Billy
 Armida as Billy's sweetheart
 Jimmy Aubrey

References

Bibliography
 Connelly, Robert B. The Silents: Silent Feature Films, 1910-36, Volume 40, Issue 2. December Press, 1998.

External links
 

1927 films
1920s action films
1920s English-language films
American silent feature films
American action films
Films directed by Duke Worne
Rayart Pictures films
1920s American films